The Reluctant Widow is a 1950 British historical drama film directed by Bernard Knowles and starring Jean Kent, Guy Rolfe, Paul Dupuis and Lana Morris. It is based on the 1946 novel The Reluctant Widow by Georgette Heyer, with the screenplay written by Gordon Wellesley and others. The screenplay concerns a governess who marries a British aristocrat, and inherits his country house when he dies. The ongoing Napoleonic Wars see her become embroiled with a spy ring.

It was shot at Denham Studios. The film's art direction was by Carmen Dillon while the costumes were designed by Beatrice Dawson.

Cast

Critical reception
Bosley Crowther wrote in The New York Times, "except for the rather fine surroundings and some nice eighteenth century costumes, there is no more in The Reluctant Widow than a genteel invitation to doze" ; while Robin Karney in the Radio Times found, "a good-looking but rather muddled and unsatisfactory adaptation of a novel by Georgette Heyer, which entertains in fits and starts."

References

External links
Review of film at Variety

1950 films
1950s historical drama films
British historical drama films
Films based on British novels
Films set in the 1810s
Films set in England
Films set in London
Napoleonic Wars spy films
Films shot at Denham Film Studios
1950 drama films
1950s English-language films
1950s British films